The 2012 European Darts Open was the third of five PDC European Tour events on the 2012 PDC Pro Tour. The tournament took place at the Maritim Hotel in Düsseldorf, Germany, from 6–8 July 2012. It featured a field of 64 players and £82,100 in prize money, with £15,000 going to the winner.

Raymond van Barneveld won the title, defeating Dave Chisnall 6–4 in the final. This was Chisnall's second successive defeat in a European Tour final.

Prize money

Qualification
The top 32 players from the PDC Order of Merit automatically qualified for the event. The remaining 32 places went to players from three qualifying events - 20 from the UK Qualifier (held in Birmingham on June 15), eight from the European Qualifier (held in Berlin on June 23), and four from the Home Nation Qualifier (also held in Berlin on June 23).

1–32

UK Qualifier
  Ian White (first round)
  Stuart Kellett (first round)
  Devon Petersen (first round)
  Tony Littleton (first round)
  James Hubbard (quarter-finals)
  Joe Cullen (second round)
  Dean Winstanley (first round)
  Ross Smith (first round)
  Mark Jones (first round)
  Brian Woods (second round)
  Mick Todd (first round)
  Scott Rand (second round)
  Steve Maish (withdrew)
  Jamie Lewis (first round)
  Andy Jenkins (first round)
  Arron Monk (first round)
  Mark Dudbridge (third round)
  Johnny Haines (third round)
  Mickey Mansell (second round)
  Jim Walker (first round)

European Qualifier
  Ronny Huybrechts (second round)
  Michael van Gerwen (third round)
  Kim Huybrechts (second round)
  Gino Vos (third round)
  Magnus Caris (first round)
  Ryan de Vreede (first round)
  Jelle Klaasen (second round)
  Tonči Restović (second round)

Host Nation Qualifier
  Kevin Münch (first round)
  Karsten Kornath (first round)
  Tomas Seyler (second round)
  Maik Langendorf (first round)

Draw

References

2012 PDC European Tour
2012 in German sport